Trapelus persicus, Olivier's agama or Baluch ground agama, is a species of agama found in Syria, Lebanon, Jordan, Saudi Arabia, Iraq, and Iran.

References

Trapelus
Lizards of Asia
Taxa named by William Thomas Blanford
Reptiles described in 1881